Chengcheng County is a county under the administration of the prefecture-level city of Weinan, in the central part of Shaanxi province, China. The county lies in the Guanzhong Plain, has a population of about 390000.

Administrative divisions
As 2019, Chengcheng County is divided to 1 subdistrict and 9 towns.
Subdistricts
 Chengguan Sudistrict

Towns

Climate

References

County-level divisions of Shaanxi
Weinan